Amadeus Paulussen (born 13 June 1981 in Basel) is a Swiss music producer.

Life 
From age 6 to 13 (between 1987 and 1994) he learned and played the violin at the Rudolf Steiner School (Waldorf education) in Pratteln and visited regularly the violin lessons at the Musikschule Basel.

At the age of 13 (In 1994), Amadeus came in contact with the then emerging Techno movement in Basel, through his sister. To satisfy his newly developed interest in electronic music, he learned to play the keyboard at the Musikhaus & Musikschule Bonvicini in Basel, as an introduction to the use of synthesizers and studio technology.

At that time (around 1995), he began to build a small pre- production studio in the basement of his family home. His former equipment included, among others, an Akai S1100, a Korg Prophecy, a Roland JV-90, a Yamaha QS-300 and some analog classics, e.g. a Roland TB-303 or Roland JX-3P.

Starting in 1996, he began working on first contracts for events and multimedia applications, amongst others, through the company of his father W.P.P. expo & event.

In order to expand his knowledge, he completed an internship with Daniel Platisa in his Basel based Q-Lab Studio, in the same year.

At the age of 17 (in 1997), he founded his own company Amadeus Paulussen Sounddesign, which he later renamed kubus media.  His desire to get a monitor system of Klein + Hummel for a trial period at his own studio, required him to present a registered business and this was the reason to found his company at such tender age. The O 100 / O 800 - monitor system is still in operation today in kubus media studio (2015).

He published in 1999, together with Daniel Sgubin (DJ Mystery), a first production in a vinyl small series, on a sub-label of DJ Beat (a Swiss vinyl records-chain): Modular Records.

Further vinyl releases did follow, with Tihomir Markovic under the pseudonym Pushing Elementz, on the Label Limiter Records. More vinyl and digital releases followed on with Francesco Calí, under the name Paulussen & Cali on DJ C-Rock's Label Lo-Fi Stereo. At the time Christian Rindermann (aka C-Rock) published artists like Ricardo Villalobos, Neville Attree, Steve Bug or Motorcitysoul on his label.

In the years 2002-2015, as managing director of kubus media, he could perform numerous jobs, with his team, including Michael Studer among others, in the area of corporate sound for clients such as Swisscom, ALPA, David Klein and Basler Versicherungsgesellschaft.

In 2011 he was introduced to the Bern based company PANArt and its instrument, the Hang, through his mother and wife. Today he plays the successor instrument together with his wife, the Gubal, and integrates it regularly in his still electronically-oriented Productions.

Since 2014 he runs the kubus media studio in Basel together with Chris Air.

In 2015 he published  his first solo album "1" (initially only in digital version). "1" was produced by Amadeus Paulussen and mixed by Chris Air at kubus media studio. It was mastered by Daniel Dettwiler (assistant: Benjamin Gut) at Basel's Idee und Klang Studio.

Discography (selection) 
 DJ Mystery & Amadeus Paulussen: Kiss the Future 12 (1999)
 Pushing Elementz: Pushing Elephantz 12 (2000)
 Pushing Elementz: Tribe House FX 12 (2001)
 Paulussen & Cali: Sinistra / Destra 12 (2006)
 Paulussen & Cali: Bicicletta / Macchina 12 (2008)
 David Klein & Amadeus Paulussen: Thomas D – Deshalb bin ich hier (2008)
 Paulussen & Cali: Circle Muzic CMCD#002 – Fetentrompete (2009)
 kubus media: Minus 8 – Baselworld (kubus media -16°C Remix) (2012)
 Amadeus Paulussen: 1 (2015)

Sources 

 Trade Registry Office listing of kubus media AG (German)
 
 
 
 kubus media Studio (German)

External links 
 Personal website of Amadeus Paulussen
 
 Amadeus Paulussen at kubus media (German)
 
 Website from W.P.P. expo & event (German)

Swiss record producers
Musicians from Basel-Stadt
1981 births
Living people